

Radio UNAL (until February 2021 branded UN Radio) is the radio station of the National University of Colombia in Bogotá (since 22 September 1991)  and Medellín (since 30 July 2002). It broadcasts academic programming, news analysis, music, and cultural events related to the university. Radio UNAL syndicates some programmes from Radio France Internationale and DW Radio.

Its morning drive flagship news programme is Análisis UNAL (until February 2021 UN Análisis), broadcast on weekdays in two segments: international news (from 06:00 to 07:30) and an analytic segment (from 08:00 to 09:00) with scholars and experts; each day a different subject is dealt with (Mondays: politics; Tuesdays: social issues; Wednesdays: science and technology; Thursdays: economy; Fridays: culture).

Between 2015 and 2019, selected programming is broadcast on Caldas FM, a public station in Manizales owned by the Governor's Office of Caldas.

Radio UNAL Web (until February 2021 UN Radio Web), Radio UNAL's online only station, is devoted to broadcasting recorded academic lectures.

Stations

Owned and operated

Over the air 
Radio UNAL Bogotá: HJUN 98.5 MHz
Radio UNAL Medellín: HJG51 100.4 MHz

Online 
Radio UNAL Web

Affiliates
Manizales: HJI42 96.3 MHz (Caldas FM, selected programming, 2015-2019)

References

External links 
Radio UNAL
Radio UNAL Bogotá on Twitter
Radio UNAL Medellín on Twitter

Radio stations in Colombia
1991 establishments in Colombia
Campus, college, student and university radio stations
National University of Colombia
Radio stations established in 1991
Mass media in Bogotá
Mass media in Medellín